Gustaf Magnus Elgenstierna (August 26, 1871 – March 21, 1948) was a Swedish historian and genealogist.

Biography
He was born on August 26, 1871 to Carl Elgenstierna and Evelina Petersohn. He married Clara Sandberg in 1908. She was the daughter of the postmaster Gustav Sandberg; and Ida Stjerncreutz.

Elgenstierna graduated in 1891,  and became the controller at General Post Board of Directors from 1919 to 1937. He was the bokauktionskommissarie in Stockholm from 1906 to 1911; member of the board of the Swedish Nobility League in 1924; corresponding member of the Society for the Danish-Norwegian Genealogical and Personal History Association in 1924; Member of the Genealogical Society of Finland in 1927; and a member of the Royal Society for the provision of manuscripts relating to Scandinavian history in 1927 and he became an honorary member of the Society for Danish Genealogical and Personal History Association in 1937. From 1911 to 1944 and was editor of Svenska Släktkalendern. From 1938 until his death he was editor of Svenska Adelns Ättartavlor where he corrected errors made by Gabriel Anrep. He died on March 21, 1948 in Sweden.

Publications
Køping stads tjænstemæn 1605-1905: personhistoriska anteckningar (1905)
Svenska Släktkalendern (1911)
Svenska adelns ättartavlor (1938)

1871 births
1948 deaths
Swedish genealogists
20th-century Swedish historians